USS Jack C. Robinson (APD-72), ex-DE-671, was a United States Navy high-speed transport in commission from 1945 to 1946.

Namesake
Jack C. Robinson was born on 22 September 1922 at Blue Ridge, Georgia. He enlisted in the United States Marine Corps on 12 December 1941. After basic training, he was assigned to a unit scheduled to take part in the Guadalcanal campaign, the first American amphibious operation of World War II.

In the bitter fighting on 23 October 1942 in the Matanikau River area on Guadalcanal during the Battle for Henderson Field, Private First Class Robinson risked his life to repair damaged communications lines vital to the survival of his unit. Robinson was mortally wounded in the action and died on 25 October 1942. He was posthumously awarded the Silver Star.

Construction and commissioning
Jack C. Robinson was laid down as the Buckley-class destroyer escort USS Jack C. Robinson (DE-671) by the Dravo Corporation at Pittsburgh, Pennsylvania and launched as such on 8 January 1944, sponsored by Mrs. Clem F. Robinson, mother of the ships namesake. The ship was reclassified as a Charles Lawrence-class high-speed transport and redesignated APD-72 on 27 June 1944, and was towed to Orange, Texas, for fitting out by the Consolidated Steel Corporation there. After conversion to her new role, the ship was commissioned at Orange on 2 February 1945.

Service history

World War II
After shakedown in the Caribbean, Jack C. Robinson departed Norfolk, Virginia, on 31 March 1945 to join the United States Pacific Fleet for World War II service in the Pacific, arriving at San Diego, California, on 14 April 1945. On 24 April 1945 she arrived at Pearl Harbor, Territory of Hawaii, to begin a month of intensive training. Arriving at Ulithi Atoll on 21 May 1945, she took up duty as an escort vessel for the massive supply convoys between staging bases and the forward areas. In June 1945 she moved to Okinawa for antisubmarine patrol offshore in support of the Okinawa campaign, departing Okinawa on 17 July 1945 to take up similar duty in the Philippine Islands.

Postwar
After the surrender of Japan brought World War II to an end on 15 August 1945, Jack C. Robinson engaged in convoy duties supporting the Allied occupation of Japan and the former Japanese Empire before returning via the Panama Canal to Norfolk early in 1946.

After exercises in the Caribbean, Jack C. Robinson arrived at the New York Naval Shipyard at Brooklyn, New York, on 24 May 1946 for extensive repairs. She then was towed to Green Cove Springs, Florida, for inactivation, arriving there on 30 October 1946.

Decommissioning and disposal
Jack C. Robinson was decommissioned at Green Cove Springs on 13 December 1946 and placed in the Florida Group of the Atlantic Reserve Fleet on the St. Johns River there. She later was moved to the Texas Group of the Atlantic Reserve Fleet at Orange, Texas.

After 20 years of inactivity in reserve, Jack C. Robinson was stricken from the Navy List on 1 December 1966.

Chilean Navy service
Jack C. Robinson was sold to Chile under the Military Assistance Program. She served in the Chilean Navy as Orella (APD-27) until stricken and scrapped.

Honors and awards
Jack C. Robinson received one battle star for her World War II service off Okinawa.

References

NavSource Online: Amphibious Photo Archive USS Jack C. Robinson (APD-72)

Charles Lawrence-class high speed transports
Ships built in Pittsburgh
Ships built in Orange, Texas
1944 ships
World War II frigates and destroyer escorts of the United States
World War II amphibious warfare vessels of the United States
Buckley-class destroyer escorts of the Chilean Navy
Atlantic Reserve Fleet, Green Cove Springs Group
Atlantic Reserve Fleet, Texas Group